Engelberd Sani (born 28 May 1990 in Sorong, West Papua) is an Indonesian professional footballer who plays as a winger or right-back for Liga 2 club PSPS Riau. He was entered in the Indonesia national U-23 team in the 2009 Southeast Asian Games. He also entered Indonesia national U-21 team in the 2012 Pre-Olympic Tournament. He studied Civil Engineering at Yogyakarta National Institute of Technology.

Club career

Persis Solo
He was signed for Persis Solo to play in Liga 2 in the 2020 season. This season was suspended on 27 March 2020 due to the COVID-19 pandemic. The season was abandoned and was declared void on 20 January 2021.

Muba Babel United
In 2021, Engelberd Sani signed with Indonesian Liga 2 club Muba Babel United. He made his league debut on 6 October against Sriwijaya at the Gelora Sriwijaya Stadium, Palembang.

Sriwijaya
He was signed for Sriwijaya to play in the second round of Liga 2 in the 2021 season. Sani made his league debut on 15 December 2021 in a match against Persiba Balikpapan at the Pakansari Stadium, Cibinong.

PSPS Riau
Sani was signed for PSPS Riau to play in Liga 2 in the 2022–23 season. He made his league debut on 29 August 2022 in a match against Semen Padang at the Riau Main Stadium, Riau.

International career
In 2009, Sani represented the Indonesia U-23, in the 2009 Southeast Asian Games.

Honours

Club
Arema Cronus
 Menpora Cup: 2013

References

External links
 Engelberd Sani at Soccerway
 Engelberd Sani at Liga Indonesia

1990 births
Association football wingers
Living people
Indonesian Christians
People from Sorong
Indonesian footballers
West Papuan sportspeople
Indonesian Premier Division players
Liga 1 (Indonesia) players
Liga 2 (Indonesia) players
Persiram Raja Ampat players
Pelita Jaya FC players
Arema F.C. players
Persisam Putra Samarinda players
Madura United F.C. players
Persis Solo players
Muba Babel United F.C. players
Sriwijaya F.C. players
PSPS Riau players
Indonesia youth international footballers